Grand Beach may refer to:

Grand Beach, Newfoundland and Labrador, a small town in Canada
Grand Beach (Manitoba), Canada
Grand Beach Provincial Park, Manitoba, Canada
Grand Beach, Michigan, United States